Mahmoud Balah (born 5 August 1942) is a Syrian wrestler. He competed in the men's Greco-Roman 78 kg at the 1968 Summer Olympics.

References

External links
 

1942 births
Living people
Syrian male sport wrestlers
Olympic wrestlers of Syria
Wrestlers at the 1968 Summer Olympics
Place of birth missing (living people)